Benedict-Leona Mines was a census-designated place (then termed an unincorporated place) in Lee County, Virginia, United States. Its first and only designation was at the 1950 United States Census when it had a population of 1,486. Benedict-Leona Mines did not reappear at subsequent censuses.

References

Unincorporated communities in Lee County, Virginia
Former census-designated places in Virginia
Unincorporated communities in Virginia